The 1932 Army Cadets football team represented the United States Military Academy in the 1932 college football season. In their third and final season under head coach Ralph Sasse, the Cadets compiled an 8–2 record, shut out eight of their ten opponents, and outscored all opponents by a combined total of 261 to 39.  In the annual Army–Navy Game, the Cadets defeated the Midshipmen  The Cadets also defeated Harvard, 40 to 0. The team's two losses were to Pittsburgh by an 18 to 13 score and a 21–0 shutout by Notre Dame at Yankee Stadium. 
 
Three Army players were recognized on the All-America team. Guard Milton Summerfelt was a consensus first-team player. End Dick King received first-team honors from the New York Sun, and second-team honors from the Associated Press (AP), Newspaper Enterprise Association (NEA), and International News Service (INS). Quarterback Felix Vidal received third-team honors from the AP.

Schedule

References

Army
Army Black Knights football seasons
Army Cadets football